Guyard is a surname. Notable people with the surname include:

Hubert Guyard, French cyclist
Marie Guyart (1599–1672), Ursuline nun of the French order
Michel Guyard (1936–2021), French Catholic bishop
Sarah Guyard-Guillot (1981–2013), French acrobat and aerialist

See also 
Villeneuve-la-Guyard, commune in the Yonne department in Bourgogne-Franche-Comté in north-central France
 Guyart